The East Central Texas forests (33) is a small temperate broadleaf and mixed forests ecoregion almost entirely within the state of Texas, United States. The northern forests perimeter is partially within the southeast Oklahoma border.

Description
East Central Texas forests are distinguished from the adjacent Texas blackland prairies and Western Gulf coastal grasslands by their greater tree density. On the other hand, they are more open and have a greater concentration of hardwoods than the forests of the Piney Woods. The climate is hot and humid.

Subregions

Northern Post Oak Savanna
The landscapes of this ecoregion are generally more level and gently rolling compared to the more dissected and irregular topography of much of Southern Post Oak Savanna. It is underlain by mostly Eocene and Paleocene-age formations with some Cretaceous rocks to the north. The deciduous forest or woodland is composed mostly of post oak, blackjack oak, eastern red cedar, and black hickory. Prairie openings contained little bluestem and other grasses and forbs. The land cover currently has more improved pasture and less post oak woods and forest than the Southern Post Oak Savanna. Some coniferous trees occur, especially on the transitional boundary with the Tertiary Uplands ecoregion. Loblolly pine has been planted in several areas. Typical wildlife species include white-tailed deer, eastern wild turkey, northern bobwhite, eastern fox squirrel, and eastern gray squirrel.

Southern Post Oak Savanna
This ecoregion has more woods and forest than the adjacent prairie ecoregions, and consists of mostly hardwoods compared to the pines to the east in the South Central Plains. Historically a post oak savanna, current land cover is a mix of post oak woods, improved pasture, and rangeland, with some invasive mesquite to the south. A thick understory of yaupon and eastern redcedar occurs in some parts. The ecoregion is underlain by Miocene, Oligocene, Eocene, and Paleocene sediments. Sand exposures within these Tertiary deposits have a distinctive sandyland flora, and in a few areas unique bogs occur. The endangered Houston Toad is associated with the deep sandy soils of this ecoregion

San Antonio Prairie
This ecoregion is a narrow, 100-mile long region occurring primarily on the Eocene Cook Mountain Formation.  Upland Alfisol prairies were dominated by little bluestem and yellow indiangrass and contained a different mix of grasses and forbs than the dark, clayey, more calcareous soils of the Northern Texas blackland prairies. Since the 1830s, settlement clustered along the Old San Antonio Road (Texas State Highway 21 in the south, Old San Antonio Road in the north) within this narrow belt of prairie land. Currently, land cover is a mosaic of woodland, improved pasture, rangeland, and some cropland.

Northern Prairie Outliers
The small, disjunct areas of this ecoregion have a blend of characteristics from the Texas blackland prairies and the East Central Texas forests. The northern two outliers, north of the Sulphur River, occur on Cretaceous sediments, while south of the river, Paleocene and Eocene formations predominate. A mosaic of forest and prairie occurred historically in this and adjacent regions. Burning was important in maintaining grassy openings, and woody invasions have taken place in the absence of fire. The tallgrass prairies included little bluestem, big bluestem, yellow indiangrass, and tall dropseed. Current land cover is mostly pasture, with some cropland.

Bastrop Lost Pines

This ecoregion is an outlier of relict loblolly pine-post oak upland forest occurring on some dissected hills. It is the westernmost tract of southern pine in the United States. The pines mostly occur on gravelly soils that formed in Pleistocene high gravel, fluvial terrace deposits associated with the ancestral Colorado River, and sandy soils that formed in Eocene sandstones (such as the Weches Formation). In this area, the deep, acidic, sandy soils and the additional moisture provided by the Colorado River contribute to the occurrence of pines, which are thought to be a relict population predating the last glacial period. The largest population of the Houston Toad occurs in this ecoregion

Floodplains and Low Terraces
This ecoregion contains floodplain and low terrace deposits downstream from the Texas blackland prairies and upstream from the Texas coastal plains. It includes only the wider floodplains of major streams, such as the Sulphur, Trinity, Brazos, and Colorado rivers. In addition, it covers primarily Holocene deposits and not Pleistocene deposits on older, high terraces. The bottomland forests contain water oak, post oak, elms, green ash, pecan, willow oak to the east, and to the west some hackberry and eastern cottonwoods. The northern floodplains tend to have more forested land cover, while in the south the Brazos and Colorado River floodplains are characterized by more cropland and pasture.

Fauna
The forests are home to a rich wildlife including Virginia opossums (Didelphis virginiana), North American least shrews (Cryptotis parva), North American beavers (Castor canadensis) and many species of butterflies and reptiles. Larger mammals that once lived here, including jaguar (Panthera onca) and Plains bison (Bison bison bison), have now disappeared from the region. Endangered fauna found in this ecoregion include the Houston toad (Bufo houstonensis) and Attwater's prairie chickens (Tympanuchus cupido attwateri).

Conservation
This environment has been heavily altered by cattle ranching and clearance for farmland with only a quarter of the original habitats remaining, in fragmented patches and not in large blocks. There are no national forests in the region.

East Central Texas forests gallery

See also
 History of Texas forests
 List of ecoregions in the United States (WWF)

References

Temperate broadleaf and mixed forests in the United States
Ecoregions of the United States
 
 
Nearctic ecoregions